Ruggero Maregatti (July 14, 1905 – October 20, 1963) was an Italian athlete who competed mainly in the 100 metres.

Biography
He competed for Italy in the 1932 Summer Olympics held in Los Angeles, California, in the 4x100 metre relay where he won the bronze medal with his team mates Giuseppe Castelli, Gabriele Salviati and Edgardo Toetti.

Ruggero Maregatti has 10 caps in national team from 1926 to 1932.

Olympic results

National titles
Ruggero Maregatti has won 6 times the individual national championship.
2 wins on 100 metres (1924, 1925)
4 wins on 200 metres (1924, 1929, 1930, 1931)

See also
 Italy national relay team

References

External links
 

1905 births
1963 deaths
Athletes from Milan
Athletes (track and field) at the 1932 Summer Olympics
Olympic athletes of Italy
Olympic bronze medalists for Italy
Italian male sprinters
Medalists at the 1932 Summer Olympics
Olympic bronze medalists in athletics (track and field)
Italian Athletics Championships winners